Józef Mieczysław Mączka (2 June 1888– 9 September 1918) was a Polish soldier, poet of the Polish Legions.

He was born in the village of Zaleszany to Franciszek Mączka, who as a teenager fought in the January Uprising in 1863.

Józef Mączka attended primary school in Oleszyce, later grammar schools (gymnasiums) in Lwów, Sanok, and since 1905 in Rzeszów, where he graduated in 1907. He later started engineering studies at the Lwów Polytechnic.

In 1913 he became a member of Riflemen's Association, and in August 1914 has been already a soldier of the Polish Legions in the 2nd Squadron of Uhlans, led by Zbigniew Dunin-Wasowicz. Mączka served there until September 1914. He took part in Carpathian and Bukovinian campaigns. On 1 November 1916 has been promoted to the rank of second lieutenant. After the Oath crisis served in the Polish Auxiliary Corps. In 1917 he was promoted to the rank of lieutenant.

In February 1918 Mączka was captured and interned by Austrians. On 28 February disguised as a railway worker he escaped from the camp and on 20 March became a soldier of Polish II Corps in Russia of General Józef Haller. In the battle of Kaniów he was captured by Germans. Mączka however escaped and started to work in the Polish Military Organization, in the section active in Ukraine. He helped to transfer soldiers of the Polish Legions to Kuban to the division of General Lucjan Żeligowski, eventually becoming soldier of this division himself in the group of Col. Zieliński.

On 9 September 1918, Lt. Józef Mączka died of cholera in Pashkovska Stanitsa near Yekaterinodar. For his participation in the battles of the Legions and his work in Polish Military Organization, Lt. Mączka has been awarded Virtuti Militari, Cross of Valour, Cross of Independence and Cross of Merit with Swords. In 1933 his corpse was brought to Warsaw and ceremonially buried at Powązki Military Cemetery.

Józef Mączka was also a known poet, the most important poet of Polish Legions. On the Christmas Eve of 1914 he wrote a Christmas carol for the Legions. In 1917 he published poetry collection Starym szlakiem (On the Old Path), which was republished thrice during the interwar period.

In November 1998 memorial obelisk to Mączka was unveiled in his birthplace Zaleszany.

Works 
 Starym szlakiem (1917)
 Wstań Polsko moja (1997)
 Starym szlakiem i inne wiersze (2009)

Footnotes

References
 

1888 births
1918 deaths
People from Stalowa Wola County
Burials at Powązki Military Cemetery
Polish Roman Catholics
Polish legionnaires (World War I)
Polish Auxiliary Corps personnel
Recipients of the Virtuti Militari
Recipients of the Cross of Valour (Poland)
Recipients of the Cross of Independence
Recipients of the Cross of Merit with Swords (Poland)
Deaths from cholera
20th-century Polish poets